The Slot is an Australian sketch comedy series produced for The Comedy Channel. This ten part series features a new generation of comedy talent, first discovered on YouTube.

Cast
 Sarah Bishop
 Jay K. Cagatay
 Natalie Tran
 Kiah Carter
 Michael Cusack
 Benjamin French
 Greta Lee Jackson
 Shae-Lee Kington
 Lana Kington
 Troy Kinne
 Madison Lloyd
 Adele Vuko
 George H. Xanthis
 Broden Kelly 
 Zach Ruane 
 Mark Samual Bonanno
 Samuel Lingham
 Thomas Armstrong 
 Ken Rodrigues 
 Justin Donnelly 
 Max Miller
 Michelle Brasier
 Bjorn Stewart
 Colin Kinchela
 Katie Beckett
 Kodie Bedford

See also

List of Australian television series

References

External links
 

2017 Australian television series debuts
2010s Australian comedy television series
Australian television sketch shows
The Comedy Channel original programming
Fox8 original programming
English-language television shows
YouTube